Manuel Junglas (born 31 January 1989) is a German former professional footballer who played as a midfielder.

Club career
Born in Cologne, Junglas joined Alemannia Aachen in 2003 and was promoted to the second squad in 2006. Junglas made a single appearance as a substitute in the Bundesliga in the 2006–07 season for Alemannia Aachen against Arminia Bielefeld.

In 2009, Junglas received a contract for the professional team. Since then he appeared seventy times in the 2. Bundesliga and scored three goals.

International career
Junglas was member of the Germany U-17 and played his first game on 21 February 2006 against Sweden U-17.

References

External links
 
 

1989 births
Living people
German footballers
Association football midfielders
Alemannia Aachen players
VfR Aalen players
Arminia Bielefeld players
FC Viktoria Köln players
Bundesliga players
2. Bundesliga players
3. Liga players
Footballers from Cologne